An East Asian tea ceremony, or Chádào,  or Dado, is a ceremonially ritualized form of making tea (茶 cha) practiced in East Asia by the Chinese, Japanese, and Koreans. The tea ceremony, literally translated as either "way of tea", "etiquette for tea or tea rite", or "art of tea" in any of the three East Asian languages, is a cultural activity involving the ceremonial preparation and presentation of tea. The Japanese tea ceremony and Korean tea ceremony were influenced by the Chinese tea culture during ancient and medieval times, starting in the 9th century when tea was first introduced to Japan and Korea from China. One can also refer to the whole set of rituals, tools, gestures, etc. used in such ceremonies as tea culture. All of these tea ceremonies and rituals contain "an adoration of the beautiful among the sordid facts of everyday life", as well as refinement, an inner spiritual content, humility, restraint and simplicity "as all arts that partake the extraordinary, an artistic artificiality, abstractness, symbolism and formalism" to one degree or another.

At the very rudimentary level, East Asian tea ceremonies are a formalized way of making tea, in a process that has been refined to yield the best taste. Historical classics on the subject include the 8th-century Chinese monograph The Classic of Tea ( Chájīng) and the 12th-century Chinese book Treatise on Tea ( Dàguān Chálùn).

In East Asia

China

In China, a tea house (茶室 cháshì, 茶館 cháguăn or 茶屋 cháwū) is traditionally similar to a coffeehouse, albeit offering tea rather than coffee.  People gather at tea houses to chat, socialize, play xiangqi or Go (weiqi), and enjoy tea, and young people often meet at tea houses for dates.

Japan

In Japanese tradition a tea house ordinarily refers to a private structure called a chashitsu designed for holding Japanese tea ceremonies. This structure and specifically the room in it where the tea ceremony takes place is called  with its entrance called a roji (露地). The architectural space called chashitsu was created for aesthetic and intellectual fulfillment. In Japan, a tea ceremony is a blend of two principles, sabi (寂) and wabi (侘). "Wabi" represents the inner, or spiritual, experiences of human lives. Its original meaning indicated quiet or sober refinement, or subdued taste "characterized by humility, restraint, simplicity, naturalism, profundity, imperfection, and asymmetry" and "emphasizes simple, unadorned objects and architectural space, and celebrates the mellow beauty that time and care to impart to materials." "Sabi," on the other hand, represents the outer, or material imperfection of life, also the original nature of things. Zen Buddhism has been an influence in the development of the tea ceremony. The elements of the Japanese tea ceremony are the harmony of nature and self-cultivation and enjoying tea in a formal and informal setting. The Japanese tea ceremony developed as a "transformative practice", and began to evolve its own aesthetic, in particular, that of  "sabis" and "wabis" principles. Understanding emptiness was considered the most effective means to spiritual awakening while embracing imperfection was honored as a healthy reminder to cherish our unpolished selves, here and now, just as we are – the first step to "Satori" or Enlightenment. Tea drinking is used as an aid to meditation, for assistance in fortune telling, for ceremonial purposes and in the expression of the arts.

The Japanese tea garden was created during the Muromachi Period (1333–1573) and Momoyama Period (1573–1600) as a setting for the Japanese tea ceremony, or chadō (茶道). The style of the garden takes its name from the roji, or path to the teahouse, which is supposed to inspire the visitor to meditate to prepare him for the ceremony. There is an outer garden, with a gate and covered arbor where guests wait for the invitation to enter. They then pass through a gate to the inner garden, where they wash their hands and rinse their mouth, as they would before entering a Shinto shrine, before going into the teahouse itself. The path is always kept moist and green, so it will look like a remote mountain path, and there are no bright flowers that might distract the visitor from his meditation. Early tea houses had no windows, but later teahouses have a wall that can be opened for a view of the garden.

Korea

In Korea, the traditional Korean tea ceremony (다례; 茶禮) central to the Korean approach to tea is an easy and natural coherence, with fewer formal rituals, absolutes, and greater freedom for relaxation, and adduces more creativity in enjoying a wider variety of teas, services, and conversation. This leads to a wider variance of teahouse design, tea garden entries and gardens, different use and styles of teawares, and regional variations in the choice of tea, choice of cakes and biscuits and snacks, seasonal and temporal variations, and the acoustic and visual ambiance of Korean teahouses.

Gallery

Outside East Asia 
Corresponding tea-drinking habits can be found worldwide. In the United Kingdom, including the Victorian-era afternoon tea or tea party ritual, was a social event, where the ritual of being seen to have the right equipment, manners, and social circle, was just as important as the drink itself. The Victorian-era tea was also influenced by the Indian tea culture, as for the choice of tea varieties.

In the United States, American tea culture has roots that trace back to the Dutch colonization of the Americas. In the colonies, teas were served with silver strainers, fine porcelain cups and pots and exquisite tea caddies. In recent years there has been a resurgence of interest in fine teas in the United States, mainly due to the lifting of China's ban on exports in 1971. From the 1920s to 1971, Americans could not get much Chinese tea and very little Indian tea was imported.

References

External links